Cora is a genus of damselflies in the family Polythoridae, the bannerwings. In a 1990 revision there were 18 species.

Species include:
Cora aurea
Cora chiribiquete
Cora chirripa
Cora confusa
Cora cyane
Cora dorada
Cora dualis
Cora inca
Cora irene
Cora jocosa
Cora klenei
Cora lugubris
Cora marina
Cora modesta
Cora munda
Cora notoxantha
Cora obscura
Cora parda
Cora semiopaca
Cora skinneri
Cora terminalis
Cora xanthostoma

References

Polythoridae
Zygoptera genera
Taxa named by Edmond de Sélys Longchamps